John Olav Norheim (born 5 April 1995) is a Norwegian football defender who currently plays for Eliteserien side HamKam.

Career
He started his career in Fløy, and made his senior debut in 2012. In 2014, he joined IK Start as a youth prospect. He then made his Tippeligaen debut in May 2015 against Molde.

In 2015, he was loaned out to Nest-Sotra Fotball. On 7 January 2016 he was loaned to KFUM Oslo. Ahead of the 2017 season he returned to Fløy.

Norheim signed with Strømmen IF for one year on 27 December 2018.

References

External links

1995 births
Living people
Sportspeople from Kristiansand
Norwegian footballers
IK Start players
Nest-Sotra Fotball players
Eliteserien players
Norwegian First Division players
Norwegian Second Division players
Norwegian Third Division players
Association football defenders
KFUM-Kameratene Oslo players
Flekkerøy IL players
Strømmen IF players
FK Jerv players